"That's How You Know" is a 2015 song by the Norwegian duo Nico & Vinz. It peaked at number nine on VG-lista, the Norwegian Official Singles Chart.

A later version released on 17 July 2015 by Nico & Vinz featuring Kid Ink and Bebe Rexha found wider international success.

Track listing
Explicit version

Clean version

Remixes single

HEYHEY Remixes single

Music video
The music video was released on 1 September 2015 at a total length of 4 minutes and 4 seconds. It was directed by RJ Collins and Pasqual Gutierrez. The video features a house party in which all the four artists are singing while playing antics.

Charts

Weekly charts
Nico & Vinz

Nico & Vinz featuring Kid Ink & Bebe Rexha

Year-end charts

Certifications

References

2014 songs
2015 singles
Nico & Vinz songs
Kid Ink songs
Bebe Rexha songs
Songs written by Julia Michaels
Songs written by Kid Ink